Peter Hall (born 26 November 1957) is a retired Australian rules footballer who played for South Melbourne in the Victorian Football League (VFL).

Notes

External links 

Living people
1957 births
Australian rules footballers from Victoria (Australia)
Sydney Swans players